Trinity School at Greenlawn is a private Christian school located in South Bend, Indiana that has grades 6-12. It was founded by the People of Praise in 1981 with fewer than 30 students. Since it attracts students from northwest Indiana and southwest Michigan, as well as international students. Located at 107 South Greenlawn Avenue in South Bend, Indiana, it offers classical Christian education to students. It is accredited by the Independent School Association of the Central States (ISACS).

The Greenlawn campus has two sister schools, Meadow View and River Ridge.  The schools are independent and are owned and operated by Trinity Schools, Inc.

Faculty
Dennis Staffelbach is the Head of School at the Greenlawn campus. Dr. Brian Peterson is the Director of college guidance. Thomas Roe is Dean of Boys and Chelsea Mertz is the Dean of Girls. Kathy Klimek is the Director of Athletics. Mr. Jon Balsbaugh is the president of Trinity Schools.

Classes
Students at Trinity School at Greenlawn take a multitude of classes, including a 6-year writing course and a 4-year Latin course.

Athletics
Trinity School at Greenlawn hosts athletic teams for its students. Their mascot is the Titans. The sports for girls are soccer and basketball. The sports for boys are soccer and basketball. Co-ed Track and Field is also available. Greenlawn has posted its best records in boys' basketball and girls' soccer. The school's home games are normally located at the Trinity School Athletic Center. Greenlawn has also hosted golf, fencing and boxing.

Extracurricular activities
Students of Trinity School at Greenlawn participate in a wide variety of sponsored extracurricular activities.

Facilities
Trinity School at Greenlawn occupies part of a complex of buildings initially named Elm Court, site of the   home of Clement Studebaker, Jr., and his family. Studebaker sold the property to Vincent Bendix. Bendix never resided in the mansion, preferring to live in Chicago, but he renovated parts of the building. In the late 1940s the Sisters of St. Joseph of the Third Order of St. Francis purchased the site for use as their motherhouse. The sisters preserved the original mansion, with renovations, and added a new three-story building adjacent to the mansion with a chapel, classrooms and residence space for the order's members. When their ministries shifted geographically away from Indiana, the sisters relocated their motherhouse. The People of Praise community acquired the property in August, 1982, for dual use by Trinity School and by the community's international headquarters. At that point the school became known as Trinity School at Greenlawn, with reference to the address on Greenlawn Avenue. Though there is some overlap, People of Praise offices are situated in the original mansion, and Trinity School leases space in the parts of the building constructed by the sisters.

References

External links 
 Blue Ribbon Schools Program
 Trinity Schools Website
 People of Praise's website

Christian schools in Indiana
Classical Christian schools
Private high schools in Indiana
Private middle schools in Indiana
Trinity Schools
Schools in St. Joseph County, Indiana
Education in South Bend, Indiana
People of Praise
1980 establishments in Indiana